No2EU is a left-wing Eurosceptic electoral alliance in the United Kingdom. It was first founded in 2009 when it campaigned under the campaign slogan No2EU — Yes to Democracy; it was led by Bob Crow and backed by the National Union of Rail, Maritime and Transport Workers (RMT), who provided most of its funding, the Communist Party of Britain and Solidarity (Scotland) among others. It participated in the 2009 European Parliament elections and the European elections in 2014 with the party name "No2EU" and the campaign slogan No2EU — Yes to Workers' Rights.

The organisation is now known as Trade Unionists Against the EU.

Summary of main policies 
No2EU's declared position is for a Europe of "democratic states that value public services and does not offer them to profiteers; a Europe that guarantees the rights of workers and does not put the interests of big business above that of ordinary people". This, it contested, is impossible within the current European Union structure and it calls for a withdrawal from the EU. In keeping with its socialist position it campaigns for public ownership of some national industries  and investment in public services.

It is hostile to fascist politics, acting as an 'internationalist alternative' to the perceived xenophobic positions of existing far-right eurosceptic parties. Tensions arising from the free movement of labour are explained as an economic issue, for example Bob Crow has stated that he is against "two workers from different countries competing against each other on different rates of pay".

History
 Alliance for Green Socialism
 Communist Party of Britain
 Indian Workers' Association
 Liberal Party
 Socialist Party
 Solidarity

This was notable as the first instance in recent history of a British trade union officially putting its support behind a national electoral presence other than the Labour Party, though the RMT had set some precedent in Scotland when it backed the Scottish Socialist Party.

2009 European Parliament election
No2EU received 153,236 votes or 1% of the national vote, winning no seats and finishing in 11th place behind Arthur Scargill's Socialist Labour Party. The alliance only fielded candidates in Great Britain, none in Northern Ireland. The regional breakdown of the vote was as follows:

After the election, activity dwindled and the campaign was statutorily de-registered by the Electoral Commission on 2 November 2010.

2014 European Parliament election
On 16 October 2013, the campaign re-registered with the Electoral Commission, consisting of an alliance of the RMT, the Socialist Party and the Communist Party of Britain, ready to contest the 2014 European Parliament election. For 2014, the slate used the party name of "No2EU" and the campaign slogan No2EU – Yes to workers' rights.

No2EU – Yes to Workers' Rights stood 46 candidates in seven regions in the 22 May euro election including London, North West, Eastern, Wales, Scotland, Yorks and Humber and West Midlands.

The candidates were as follows:

No2EU deregistered as a political party on 1 November 2014.  It did not contest the 2019 European Parliament elections.

European Parliament

Notes

References

Communist Party of Britain
Eurosceptic parties in the United Kingdom
Socialist parties in the United Kingdom
Socialist Party (England and Wales)
Political party alliances in the United Kingdom
2009 in British politics
2009 establishments in the United Kingdom
Euroscepticism in the United Kingdom